Hamidou Djibo (born March 8, 1985 in Niger) is a Nigerien football striker. He currently plays for AS GNN in the Niger Premier League.

Djibo was the member of the Niger national football team, and was part of the squad during the World Cup qualifiers.

Career
He previously played for ES Sétif from Algeria and the RC Kadiogo from Burkina Faso. He won national championship in 2011 with his club AS GNN.

International career
He was a member of the Niger national football team.

External links 

FIFA Profile
DZFoot Profile

1985 births
Living people
Nigerien footballers
Nigerien expatriates in Algeria
Association football defenders
Expatriate footballers in Burkina Faso
Expatriate footballers in Algeria
Rail Club du Kadiogo players
Nigerien expatriate sportspeople in Burkina Faso
People from Niamey
ES Sétif players
Niger international footballers
Akokana FC players
Nigerien expatriate sportspeople in Algeria
AS GNN players